Khalid Khozh-Baudiyevich Kadyrov (born 19 April 1994) is a Russian former footballer who played as a left winger.

Career
Kadyrov made his professional debut for FC Terek Grozny on 13 July 2010 in the Russian Cup game against FC Luch-Energiya Vladivostok.

Kadyrov made his Russian Premier League debut for FC Terek Grozny on 6 May 2012 in a game against FC Amkar Perm. He retired on 27 October 2022.

Career statistics

Club

Personal life
Kadyrov is a nephew of Chechen politician Ramzan Kadyrov.

References

External links
 
 
  Player page on the official FC Terek Grozny website
 

1994 births
People from Gudermessky District
Russian people of Chechen descent
Chechen people
Living people
Russian footballers
Association football midfielders
Association football forwards
Russia under-21 international footballers
FC Akhmat Grozny players
Russian Premier League players
Sportspeople from Chechnya